"Här kommer alla känslorna (på en och samma gång)" ("Here Are All the Emotions (At the Same Time)") is a song written and performed by Per Gessle, and is the first single from his fourth studio album Mazarin. The single is Gessle's most successful release in Sweden, spending two months at number one on the Swedish Singles Chart, subsequently gaining platinum status. The song earned Gessle two awards in Sweden; a Rockbjörnen for Best Swedish Song and a Grammis for Best Song.

Track listing
"Här kommer alla känslorna (På en och samma gång)" – 2:39
"Nu är det ju juli igen, ju" – 2:18

Charts

References

Per Gessle songs
Songs written by Per Gessle
2003 singles
Number-one singles in Sweden
2003 songs